Jefferson Township is one of thirteen townships in Henry County, Indiana, United States. As of the 2010 census, its population was 1,504 and it contained 615 housing units.

Jefferson Township was organized in 1843.

Geography
The streams of Bethel Brook, Gander Run, Lake Branch and Sulphur Drain run through this township.

Cities and towns
 Sulphur Springs

Adjacent townships
 Monroe Township, Delaware County (northeast)
 Prairie Township (east)
 Henry Township (southeast)
 Harrison Township (southwest)
 Fall Creek Township (west)
 Salem Township, Delaware County (northwest)

Cemeteries
The township contains two cemeteries: Bethel and Sharp.

Major highways
  U.S. Route 36

References
 
 United States Census Bureau cartographic boundary files

External links
 Indiana Township Association
 United Township Association of Indiana

Townships in Henry County, Indiana
Townships in Indiana